Amy Cotton (born 22 January 1980) is a judoka from Canada, who won the bronze medal in the women's half heavyweight division (-78 kg) at the 2003 Pan American Games in Santo Domingo, Dominican Republic. She represented Canada at the 2004 Summer Olympics in Athens, Greece and the 2012 Summer Olympics in London, United Kingdom.

Cotton was diagnosed with juvenile arthritis at the age of fourteen and was told that if she continued, she would most likely have serious health complications by the age of 21. Cotton continued to train and is a two time Olympian. She now lives in Saskatchewan.

See also
 Judo in Canada
 List of Canadian judoka

References

External links
 
 

1980 births
Living people
Canadian female judoka
Judoka at the 2003 Pan American Games
Judoka at the 2004 Summer Olympics
Judoka at the 2012 Summer Olympics
Olympic judoka of Canada
People from Antigonish, Nova Scotia
Sportspeople from Nova Scotia
Pan American Games bronze medalists for Canada
Pan American Games medalists in judo
Medalists at the 2003 Pan American Games
20th-century Canadian women
21st-century Canadian women